Bras-d'Asse is a commune in the Alpes-de-Haute-Provence department in the Provence-Alpes-Côte d'Azur region in southeastern France.

Demonym
The inhabitants are named Bras d'assiens

Geography
The village is at an elevation of 475 meters (1558 ft). The bordering municipalities are Saint-Jeannet, Estoublon, Saint-Julien-d'Asse, Saint-Jurs and Puimoisson. The municipality of Bras d'Asse is composed of three different hamlets : les Orésonnis, la Bégude Blanche and les Courtiers.

Hydrology
The Asse river flows through the commune.

Environment
Woods occupies 51% of the municipal area.

Population

See also
Communes of the Alpes-de-Haute-Provence department

References

Communes of Alpes-de-Haute-Provence
Alpes-de-Haute-Provence communes articles needing translation from French Wikipedia